Charles Maxwell Button (August 5, 1913 – 1983) was a former civil servant and politician in Newfoundland. He represented Trinity South in the Newfoundland House of Assembly from 1949 to 1956.

The son of Elisha Button and Minnie Thistle, he was born in New Melbourne in 1913 and was educated there. He joined the Royal Newfoundland Constabulary in 1931, becoming sergeant in charge of Labrador police patrols in 1934. From 1938 to 1949, he worked as a relief inspector in the Department of Public Welfare. Button was elected to the Newfoundland assembly in 1949 and was re-elected in 1951. He retired from politics in 1956.

In 1944, Button married Winnifred Barbour. He died in 1983.

References 

1913 births
1983 deaths
Liberal Party of Newfoundland and Labrador MHAs